Rosanna Crawford (born 23 May 1988) is a Canadian biathlete.

Career
Crawford competed at the 2010 Winter Olympics in Vancouver in the women's sprint (7.5 km) and individual (15 km) competitions.  She placed 72nd in the sprint on 13 February 2010 with a time of 23:04.6 and no penalties resulting in a +3:09.0 deficit. At the 2014 Winter Olympics in Sochi she was part of the women's relay team which finished eighth, Canada's best ever finish in this Olympic event.

Crawford was named as Biathlon Canada's Female Athlete of the Year for the 2012-13 season.

2018 Winter Olympics
In January 2018, Crawford was named to Canada's 2018 Olympic team where she finished 53rd in the women's sprint.

Personal
She was part of a group of five athletes who posed for the Bold Beautiful Biathlon calendar. Her older sister is Chandra Crawford, who won the gold medal in the cross-country sprint at the 2006 Winter Olympics.

Biathlon results
All results are sourced from the International Biathlon Union.

Olympic Games
0 medal

*The mixed relay was added as an event in 2014.

World Championships
0 medal

*During Olympic seasons competitions are only held for those events not included in the Olympic program.
**The single mixed relay was added as an event in 2019.

World Cup

References

External links
Rosanna Crawford at Biathlon Alberta

1988 births
Living people
People from Canmore, Alberta
Canadian female biathletes
Biathletes at the 2010 Winter Olympics
Biathletes at the 2014 Winter Olympics
Biathletes at the 2018 Winter Olympics
Olympic biathletes of Canada